Lt.-Gen. Hay MacDowall (died March 1809) was a Scottish officer in the British Army who was the sixth General Officer Commanding, Ceylon. He was appointed on 19 July 1799. He was succeeded by David Douglas Wemyss. Fort MacDowall in Matale was named due to his involvement during Kandyan Wars. Only the remnants of gateway and portion of the ramparts are exist today.

Biography 
MacDowall hailed from Garthland Mains, Dumfries and Galloway, Scotland, where the family seat was Garthland Castle. He was the fourth son of William MacDowell (c.1719–84), M.P. for Renfrewshire, and Elizabeth Graham, granddaughter of Alexander Livingstone, 3rd Earl of Callendar. His brothers William MacDowall (c.1749–1810) and Captain David McDowall-Grant (1761–1841) were Members of Parliament. His nephew was Lt. Gen. 
Day Hort MacDowall (1795–1870) and great-nephew was Canadian politician Day Hort MacDowall (1850–1927).

In August 1782, he was the commanding officer of the fort of Trincomalee when the French lay siege to it in the run-up to the Battle of Trincomalee. He surrendered to Suffren on 30 August in exchange for safe passage to Madras for his 1,000-man garrison.

Later life and disappearance
MacDowall was appointed Lieutenant-Colonel of the 57th Regiment of Foot in 1791 and served in Flanders in 1793 and after serving as Commander-in-Chief in Ceylon from 1798 to 1804. In 1802, as a Major-General, he was appointed Colonel commandant of a Battalion of the 40th Regiment of Foot in place of Lord Hutchinson. He was appointed Commander-in-Chief of the Madras Army in 1807. He was made Colonel of the 41st Regiment of Foot in 1808. Following a period of dispute with the civil government of Madras over his exclusion from its council, and the affair of the arrest of Quartermaster-General John Munro, he resigned his commission in January 1809 and took ship for England on the East Indiaman Lady Jane Dundas. The ship was lost with all hands near the Cape of Good Hope in March 1809.

See also
List of people who disappeared mysteriously at sea

Sources and references 
 Notes

References

 Bibliography
 
 

 

 

1800s missing person cases
1809 deaths
40th Regiment of Foot officers
41st Regiment of Foot officers
57th Regiment of Foot officers
British Army generals
British Army personnel of the American Revolutionary War
General Officers Commanding, Ceylon
Missing person cases in Africa
People from Dumfries and Galloway
People lost at sea
Year of birth missing